Julie de Carneilhan is a 1950 French drama film directed by Jacques Manuel and starring Edwige Feuillère, Pierre Brasseur and Jacques Dumesnil. It is an adaptation of the 1941 novel of the same title by Colette.

The film's sets were designed by the art director René Moulaert.

Cast
 Edwige Feuillère as Julie de Carneilhan 
 Pierre Brasseur as Hubert Espivant 
 Jacques Dumesnil as Léon de Carneilhan 
 Marcelle Chantal as Marianne 
 Michel Lemoine as Toni 
 Sylvia Bataille as Lucie 
 Gabrielle Fontan as La concierge 
 Marion Delbo as La mère Encelade 
 Andrée Tainsy as Madame Sabrier 
 Jacques Dacqmine as Coco Votard 
 Georges Pally as Beaupied 
 Georges Paulais as L'homme d'affaires 
 Léon Berton as Le palefrenier

References

Bibliography 
 Parish, Robert. Film Actors Guide. Scarecrow Press, 1977.

External links 
 

1950 films
French drama films
1950 drama films
1950s French-language films
Films directed by Jacques Manuel
Films based on French novels
Films based on works by Colette
French black-and-white films
1950s French films